Our Lady of the Rosary College (OLR) is a Catholic female secondary school in Kowloon Tong, Hong Kong. It was founded in 1971. The motto of the school is "Purity and Charity". Most of the subjects are taught in English. Students are divided into four houses including white, yellow, red and green.

External links
 
Our Lady of the Rosary College at the Hong Kong Education Bureau 

Catholic secondary schools in Hong Kong
Secondary schools in Hong Kong
Girls' schools in Hong Kong
1971 establishments in Hong Kong